Laurence Moody (born 28 January 1948) is an English television director who, after reading English at Cambridge University, worked as a trainee at Granada Television, at this time directing a number of episodes of their top rated ITV1 soap opera, Coronation Street.

Family
He is a second cousin removed of the renowned actor, Ron Moody, and the nephew of the former head of light entertainment at Yorkshire Television, Sid Collin. He is married and has three daughters: the actress/producer Clare Lawrence, musician Laura Moody and film co-ordinator Lottie Lawrence.

External links

References

Living people
1948 births
English television directors
English Jews